In mathematics, a dual wavelet is the dual to a wavelet. In general, the wavelet series generated by a square-integrable function will have a dual series, in the sense of the Riesz representation theorem. However, the dual series is not itself in general representable by a square-integrable function.

Definition
Given a square-integrable function , define the series  by

for integers .

for all bi-infinite square summable series .  Here,  denotes the square-sum norm:

and  denotes the usual norm on :

By the Riesz representation theorem, there exists a unique dual basis  such that

Indeed, there exists a unique series representation for a square-integrable function f expressed in this basis:

If there exists a function  such that

then  is called the dual wavelet or the wavelet dual to ψ. In general, for some given R-function ψ, the dual will not exist.

An example of an R-function without a dual is easy to construct. Let  be an orthogonal wavelet. Then define  for some complex number z. It is straightforward to show that this ψ does not have a wavelet dual.

See also
 Multiresolution analysis

References
 Charles K. Chui, An Introduction to Wavelets (Wavelet Analysis & Its Applications), (1992), Academic Press, San Diego, 

Wavelets
Wavelet